Terrimonas rubra is a Gram-negative, rod-shaped, non-spore-forming and non-motile bacterium from the genus of Terrimonas which has been isolated from polluted farmland soil from China.

References

External links
Type strain of Terrimonas rubra at BacDive -  the Bacterial Diversity Metadatabase

Chitinophagia
Bacteria described in 2012